Korean Military may refer to
Korean People's Army, the military of North Korea
Republic of Korea Armed Forces, the military of South Korea

See also
Military history of Korea, for information about the Korean military prior to the division of Korea